Paul Therèse van der Maesen de Sombreff (25 October 1827 in Maastricht – 14 November 1902, Maastricht) was a Dutch politician and Minister of Foreign Affairs of the Netherlands between 1862 and 1864.

1827 births
1902 deaths
Jonkheers of the Netherlands
Ministers of Foreign Affairs of the Netherlands
Independent politicians in the Netherlands
Politicians from Maastricht
Leiden University alumni
Members of the Provincial-Executive of Limburg